Sex Criminals is a comic book series published by American company Image Comics. It is written by Matt Fraction and illustrated by Chip Zdarsky. The first issue was published on September 25, 2013. Since publication, the series has continuously received critical acclaim.

Sex Criminals was nominated for two Eisner Awards in 2014 including Best Continuing Series and won Best New Series. On February 25, 2015, it was announced that Matt Fraction made a deal with Universal TV to turn Sex Criminals into a television show.

According to the American Library Association, the hardcover release Big Hard Sex Criminals was the seventh most banned and challenged book in the United States in 2016, due to being considered sexually explicit.

Synopsis
Suzie, a librarian, and Jon, an actor, meet at a party and end up sleeping together. Later, they are shocked to discover that they share the ability to freeze time when they orgasm. As their relationship develops and their sexual histories are explored, they decide to rob the bank where Jon works in order to save Suzie's endangered library.

Publication history
In March 2013, Image Comics announced a sex comedy during the Emerald City Comicon. Later reports confirmed that it was intended for mature readers and would have Matt Fraction and Chip Zdarsky in the forefront. Films like The 40-Year-Old Virgin, Bridesmaids, and Jackass: The Movie were mentioned as touchstones for the comics, and Fraction himself confirmed in an interview that the works of Billy Wilder also inspired him deeply in writing.

Fraction and Zdarsky had known each other for a short time before the book's creation. They communicated almost exclusively online and Zdarsky was the first to suggest a collaboration. Initially, Zdarsky wanted to write a book that was their take on fantasy, as neither was a big fan of the genre. Fraction responded with another idea, suggesting, "[W]hat if we do a sex comedy about a guy, who every time he ejaculates, stops time?" Zdarsky was tired from a business trip he was on and agreed to the idea without much thought. After continued communication, their idea began to grow until the book was published in September 2013. The book has gained a cult following and its fans refer to themselves as 'brimpers' after a sex position described in the first issue.

A special issue, referred to as the "Sexual Gary Special," was released in September 2020.

Reception
Time honored Sex Criminals as the #1 comic series/graphic novel of 2013.

IGN tagged the work as "amazing", and said that the story is "so addictive, you'll find yourself staring at the last page in horror when you realize you'll have to wait another month to find out what happens next".

Paste called the first issue "splendid", with "an immediately likable character", specifying that although one "wouldn’t trust most comic creators to turn a sexual awakening into compelling pulp fiction (...) Fraction and Zdarsky pull it off masterfully."

The first compilation, Sex Criminals: One Weird Trick, was nominated for the 2015 Hugo Award for Best Graphic Story.

According to the American Library Association, the hardcover release Big Hard Sex Criminals was the seventh most banned and challenged book in the United States in 2016, due to being considered sexually explicit.

Collected editions

Trade paperback releases

Hardcover releases

See also

 Portrayal of women in American comics
 Erotic comics

References

External links
 Sex Criminals at Image Comics
 
 

2013 comics debuts
Comics about women
Comics by Matt Fraction
Image Comics titles
Eisner Award winners for Best New Series
Fictional bank robbers
Sex comedy